Nowa Wieś  is a village in the administrative district of Gmina Domaszowice, within Namysłów County, Opole Voivodeship, in south-western Poland.

References

Villages in Namysłów County